Victor Eric Webber (1906-2005) was an Australian professional rugby league footballer who played in the New South Wales Rugby League (NSWRL) competition.

Playing career
Webber, a Winger,  played for the Eastern Suburbs in the years 1927 and 1928. In the 1928 season Webber played in the Eastern Suburbs side that was defeated by South Sydney in that year's premiership decider. Webber was a participant in rugby league first night match, a 10 aside exhibition game that took place in December 1928.

Webber also played one game for foundation club Glebe in 1926 which was against Eastern Suburbs at Wentworth Park.

References

The Eastern Suburbs website

1906 births
2005 deaths
Australian rugby league players
Sydney Roosters players
Rugby league wingers
Rugby league fullbacks
Place of birth missing
Glebe rugby league players